The 2017 Oregon State Beavers Football Team represented Oregon State University during the 2017 NCAA Division I FBS football season. The team played their home games on campus at Reser Stadium in Corvallis, Oregon as a member of the North Division of the Pac-12 Conference.

The Beavers entered the season with Gary Andersen as coach in his third year. After his squad opened with losses in five of their first six games, with their only win against Portland State, Andersen agreed to resign as coach. The team promoted second year cornerbacks coach, Cory Hall, to interim head coach.

They finished the season 1–11, 0–9 in Pac-12 play to finish in last place in the North Division.

Previous season 
The Beavers finished the 2016 season 4–8, 3–6 in Pac-12 play to finish in a tie for fourth place in the North Division.

Preseason 
In the Pac-12 preseason media poll, the Beavers were picked to finish in fifth place in the North Division.

Schedule

Source:

Roster

Game summaries

at Colorado State

Portland State

Minnesota

at Washington State

Washington

at USC

Colorado

Stanford

at California

at Arizona

Arizona State

at Oregon

References

Oregon State
Oregon State Beavers football seasons
Oregon State Beavers football